The Treaty of Paris was signed on 7 February 1623, between France, Savoy, and Venice.
All three signatories agreed to re-establish the territory of Valtelline by attempting to remove Spanish forces stationed there.

See also
List of treaties

References

External links
 Thirty Years War 1621 to 1626
 The Valtelline (1603–1639)
 Text of treaty (german) League France-Venice-England-Savoy March 1623 (11 points)

1623 in Italy
1623 in France
Treaties of the Republic of Venice
1623 treaties
Paris (1623)
Treaties of the Duchy of Savoy
History of Paris
17th century in Paris
1623 in the Republic of Venice
17th-century military history of Italy